Palpita tsisabiensis is a moth in the family Crambidae. It is found in Namibia.

References

Palpita
Moths described in 2004
Moths of Africa